Connecticut's 141st House district is one of 151 Connecticut House of Representatives districts. The district contains Rowayton and part of Darien. Its current representative is Tracy Marra.

List of representatives

Recent Election Results

2022

2020

External links 
 Connecticut House District Map

References

141
Darien, Connecticut
141st